Pectinidens diaphanus is a species of gastropods belonging to the family Lymnaeidae.

The species is found in America.

References

Lymnaeidae